Si Tú Te Vas (Eng.: If You Go) is the title of a studio album released by Mexican group Los Temerarios on July 8, 2008. This album became their eighth number-one set on the  Billboard Top Latin Albums the most for any group. By the time this album was released all original members were gone, Fernando Angel, Karlo Vidal, and Jonathan Amabilis depart in 2005 leaving only Adolfo and Gustavo.

On March 31, 2009, Los Temerarios released Si Tú Te Vas (Deluxe Edition) with an extended version of Si Tú Te Vas, and a bonus DVD with some bonus tracks videos, and extras.

Standard Edition
The information from Billboard.

Si Tú Te Vas (Deluxe Edition) Bonus DVD
The information from  Lostemerarios.net (Official Website)

 BONUS DVD
 Si Tú Te Vas (VIDEO)
 Loco Por Ti (VIDEO)
 Extras (Si Tú Te Vas) Making Of
 Extras (Loco Por Ti) Making Of
 Special Interview (Extras)
 Photo Gallery

Charts

Weekly charts

Year-end charts

Sales and certifications

References

2008 albums
Los Temerarios albums
 Spanish-language albums
 Fonovisa Records albums